Sheykh Neshin Rural District is a rural district (dehestan) in Shanderman District, Masal County, Gilan Province, Iran. At the 2006 census, its population was 6,495, in 1,700 families. The rural district has 16 villages.

References 

Rural Districts of Gilan Province
Masal County